Pay-e Borj (also Romanized as Pāy-e Borj and Pā Borj) is a village in Qaleh-ye Mozaffari Rural District, in the Central District of Selseleh County, Lorestan Province, Iran. At the 2006 census, its population was 193, in 38 families.

References 

Towns and villages in Selseleh County